Henry James Stevenson (12 July 1867 – 8 August 1945) was a Scotland international rugby union player. He played at Full Back. He also played first-class cricket.

Rugby Union career

Amateur career

Stevenson played for Edinburgh Academicals.

Provincial career

He played for Edinburgh District against Glasgow District in the 1 December 1888 inter-city match. Stevenson played as a Half Back that match with Henry Chambers taking the Full Back position.

He also played the same position for East of Scotland District in their 26 January 1889 match against West of Scotland District.

International career

Stevenson was capped 15 times for Scotland and took part in six Home Nations campaigns. This included being part of Scotland's 1891 Home Nations Triple Crown winning side as well as the team which were joint winners with England the previous Championship. The only points of his career were scored through a drop goal in a win against Wales at Edinburgh during their Triple Crown year.

Cricket career

On the cricket field Stevenson was a slow underarm bowler and right-handed batsman. He appeared in five first-class matches between 1901 and 1905, once for the PF Warner's XI, another with HDG Leveson-Gower's XI, twice for the Marylebone Cricket Club and once with Scotland. He managed four wickets at 67.25 and scored 104 runs at 11.55, with a highest score of 35. His biggest wicket was that of Australian Test batsman Reggie Duff, whom he dismissed in one of his matches for Marylebone. His nephew, Alexander Stevenson, was also a first-class cricketer.

See also
 List of Scottish cricket and rugby union players

References

Sources

 Bath, Richard (ed.) The Scotland Rugby Miscellany (Vision Sports Publishing Ltd, 2007 )

External links
Cricinfo: Henry Stevenson

1867 births
1945 deaths
Scottish cricketers
Scottish rugby union players
Scotland international rugby union players
Edinburgh Academicals rugby union players
Cricketers from Edinburgh
Marylebone Cricket Club cricketers
P. F. Warner's XI cricketers
Rugby union players from Edinburgh
Edinburgh District (rugby union) players
East of Scotland District players
Rugby union fullbacks
H. D. G. Leveson Gower's XI cricketers